Erin Ness (born December 9, 1978) is an American poker player, former photo producer for Maxim Magazine, and television personality, including appearances on GSN's Poker Royale.

In 2004, she was the third highest placing woman in the main event of the World Series of Poker (WSOP), finishing in the money in 207th place. Since this finish has become a member of Team PokerStars.

She continues to play poker online and in casinos.  As of 2010, her total live tournament winnings exceed $20,000.

A graduate of Georgetown University, Ness lives in New York City.

References

External links
 Official site

1978 births
American poker players
Georgetown University alumni
Living people
Sportspeople from New York City
Female poker players